Frederick or Fred Cooper may refer to:

 Fred Cooper (bicyclist) (1852–1935), professional racing cyclist and bicycle manufacturer
 Fred Cooper (cricketer, born 1888) (1888–1958), Essex cricketer
 Fred Cooper (cricketer, born 1921) (1921–1986), Lancashire and Worcestershire cricketer
 Fred Cooper (footballer) (1934–1972), professional footballer for West Ham United in the 1950s
 Fred Cooper (illustrator), Society of Illustrators's Hall of Fame
 Frederick Augustus Cooper (1834–1908), Australian politician
 Frederick Henry Cooper (1827–1869), served as Deputy Commissioner of Amritsar, Punjab during the Indian rebellion of 1857
 Frederic Taber Cooper (1864–1937), American editor and writer
 Frederick Cooper (actor) (1890–1945), British actor in Henry V
 Frederick Cooper (historian), American historian and professor of history at New York University
 Fred Cooper (sport shooter) (1910–?), British Olympic sport shooter
 Fred Cooper (boat designer), powerboat designer, early of the British Power Boat Company
 Fred Cooper (rugby union), Welsh rugby union footballer of the 1890s for Yorkshire, Newport Athletic RFC, and Bradford FC

See also
Cooper (surname)